Ginny Redington Dawes (May 13, 1945 – December 31, 2022) was an American songwriter, singer, and author.  Best known for the commercial jingles she wrote and co-wrote,  including "You, You're the One" (for McDonald's) and "Coke is It" (for Coca-Cola), Dawes also co-wrote two books about antique jewelry and a musical, The Talk of the Town.

References

1945 births
2022 deaths
Musicians from Brooklyn